Martin Eimer FBA is professor of psychology, Birkbeck College, University of London. He was elected a fellow of the British Academy in 2016. Eimer is a specialist in cognitive and neural mechanisms of visual attention and working memory, integration of attention across sensory modalities, and face perception and recognition and their impairment in prosopagnosia.

References 

Living people
Fellows of the British Academy
Academics of Birkbeck, University of London
Bielefeld University alumni
British cognitive neuroscientists
Year of birth missing (living people)